Spaghetti and meatballs is an Italian-American dish consisting of spaghetti, tomato sauce and meatballs. 

Originally inspired by similar dishes from southern Italy, the modern version of spaghetti and meatballs was developed by Italian immigrants in the USA. However, combinations of pasta with meat date back at least to the Middle Ages, and pasta (including long pasta) dishes with tomato sauce and different kinds of meatballs are documented in certain Italian regions and in modern Italian cookbooks as maccheroni alle polpette (translated as "spaghetti with meatballs") and maccheroni alla chitarra con polpette, though these dishes are often found only in particular regions and towns. They are especially popular in certain areas of Southern Italy, from where most Italian immigrants to the United States emigrated, though generally the version served in Southern Italy features smaller meatballs than the current Italian-American and Italian immigrant version.

History
Spaghetti and meatballs was popular among Italian immigrants in New York City, who had access to a more plentiful meat supply than in Italy.

 In 1888, Juliet Corson of New York published a recipe for pasta with meatballs and tomato sauce. 
 In 1909 a recipe for "Beef Balls with Spaghetti" appeared in American Cookery, Volume 13. 
 The National Pasta Association (originally named the National Macaroni Manufacturers Association) published a recipe for spaghetti with meatballs in the 1920s. 
 In 1931 Venice Maid in New Jersey was selling canned "spaghetti with meatballs in sauce". 
 In 1938 the exact phrase "spaghetti and meatballs" appeared in a list of canned foods produced by Ettore Boiardi, later known as Chef Boyardee, in Milton, Pa.

Italian writers and chefs often mock the dish as pseudo-Italian or non-Italian, because in Italy meatballs are smaller and are only served with egg-based, baked pasta. However, various kinds of pasta with meat are part of the culinary tradition of Abruzzo, Apulia, Sicily, and other parts of southern Italy. A recipe for rigatoni with meatballs is in Il cucchiaio d'argento (The Silver Spoon), a comprehensive Italian cookbook.

In Abruzzo, chitarra alla teramana is a standard first course made with spaghetti alla chitarra, small meatballs (polpettine or pallottine), and a meat or vegetable ragù.

Other dishes that have similarities to spaghetti and meatballs include pasta seduta 'seated pasta' and maccaroni azzese in Apulia.

Some baked pasta dishes from Apulia combine pasta and meat where meatballs, mortadella, or salami are baked with rigatoni, tomato sauce, and mozzarella, then covered with a pastry top.

Other pasta recipes include slices of meat rolled up with cheese, cured meats and herbs (involtini in Italian) and braciole ("bra'zhul" in Italian-American and Italian-Australian slang) that are cooked within sauce but pulled out to be served as a second course.

See also

 Bolognese sauce
 Italian-American cuisine
 List of meatball dishes
 List of pasta dishes
 Meatball sandwich
 Spaghetti alla chitarra

References

Further reading
 Origins of spaghetti and meatballs in the Atlantic

External links

 Spaghetti and meatballs recipe on All Recipes.com

Spaghetti dishes
Meatballs
Italian-American cuisine
Cuisine of New York City
Italian-American culture in New York City